Castle Amber is a Dungeons & Dragons adventure module designed by Tom Moldvay. This was the second module designed for use with the Expert D&D set. The module is in part an adaptation of Clark Ashton Smith's Averoigne stories, and set in the fictional medieval French province of that name.

Plot summary
The player characters explore the haunted mansion of the Amber family, and encounter new monsters such as the brain collector. The module is an adventure scenario set in a castle surrounded by an unusual gray mist.

During their night's rest on their way to Glantri, the player characters are unexpectedly drawn into a large castle surrounded by an impenetrable, deadly mist. This is the result of a curse the wizard-noble Stephen Amber (Etienne d'Amberville) put on his treacherous relatives for murdering him.

The only way to escape Castle Amber (or Château d'Amberville) is to explore the castle, putting up with the demented, and at times insane, members of the d'Amberville family and the other, often hostile, denizens, and open a hidden portal to the wilderness of the world of Averoigne, where the party can find the means to reach the inter-dimensional tomb in which Stephen Amber rests, in order to break the curse and return home.

In this world, magic is frowned upon, and spellcasters may come to the attention of the Inquisition.

Inspirations
The module's credits give special thanks to Clark Ashton Smith and Casiana Literary Enterprises, Inc., "for use of the Averoigne stories as inspirational material." Castle Amber (Château d'Amberville) draws from the Averoigne stories of Clark Ashton Smith. The main non-player characters of the module, the Amber family (d'Amberville in French, as an option), are not actually in any of Smith's stories, and were created by the designer to provide a link to Averoigne. A selected bibliography is included at the rear of the module.

In addition to the Averoigne references, there are individual encounters within the module that have allusions to stories written by others.

One of the encounters in the module is an homage to (or copy of) the climax of Edgar Allan Poe's short story Fall of the House of Usher, involving a brother who can hear his dead sister, named Madeline in both cases, crying out from the grave where she was buried alive. The overall module has "a decidedly Edgar Allan Poe feel to it."  Another encounter calls to mind the title character and gruesome climax of Poe's Hop-Frog.

Many of the creatures also had a "Lovecraftian" feel to them.

The module also is inspired by Roger Zelazny's The Chronicles of Amber series.  One character in the first series of rooms is clearly a representation of 'Caine' Amber from the books. The Gray Mist/curse mirrors main character 'Corwin' Amber's curse he utters after his torture and imprisonment by his family, and the room 'The Hall of Mirrors' from the module is inspired by an identical room from the Zelazny book series.

Publication history
Castle Amber was the second module designed for use with the D&D Expert Set. It was written by Tom Moldvay and published 1981 as a 32-page booklet with an outer folder and a cover designed by Erol Otus.

The module was developed by Dave Cook, Allen Hammack, Kevin Hendryx, Harold Johnson, Tom Moldvay, and Jon Pickens, and edited by Harold Johnson, Edward Sollers, and Steve Winter. It features art by Jim Holloway, Harry Quinn, Jim Roslof, Stephen D. Sullivan, and Erol Otus.

Mark of Amber was a sequel/remake of the original Castle Amber. It was reprinted in 1995 in the form of a boxed set, complete with an audio CD, map posters, and player handouts. It was part of the short lived Masters series. The Castle was renamed Château Sylaire.

Reception
Castle Amber was ranked the 15th greatest Dungeons & Dragons adventure of all time by Dungeon magazine in 2004, and was fondly remembered in Dragon Magazine the same year.

In an earlier review in issue No. 35 of White Dwarf magazine, reviewer Jim Bambra rated Castle Amber 6 out of 10. Bambra saw the adventure as "an attempt to bring randomness back into D&D." Bambra considered Castle Amber a chaotic adventure and did not recommend it for purchase, noting that it "depends a lot on chance, leaving little room for skill, and at times can be deadly."

Further reading

References

Dungeons & Dragons modules
France in fiction
Mystara
Role-playing game supplements introduced in 1981